F. W. Bernstein (born Fritz Weigle; 4 March 1938 – 20 December 2018) was a German poet, cartoonist, satirist, and academic. He worked for the satirical biweekly pardon. After teaching at schools, he was professor of caricature and comics at the Berlin Academy of the Arts from 1984 to 1999. He was one of the founding members of the Neue Frankfurter Schule, which published the satirical magazine Titanic.

Career 
Born in Göppingen on 4 March 1938, Fritz Weigle was the only son of Anna (née Krathwohl) and Friedrich Weigle. He attended the gymnasium in Göppingen, where he was known by the nickname Bernstein. He studied from 1957 at the Stuttgarter Kunstakademie where he met Robert Gernhardt. In 1958, they both moved to the Berlin Academy of the Arts. Weigle returned to Stuttgart where he took the exam to be an art teacher in 1961. Later in 1961, he studied graphics in Berlin, and simultaneously German at the Free University of Berlin, completing in 1964.

He was appointed professor of caricature and comics at the Berlin Academy of the Arts in 1984, the only such chair, and held the post until he retired in 1999. In April 1964, he began work for the satirical biweekly magazine pardon. He founded together with Gernhardt and F. K. Waechter its appendix  (World in the mirror), published until 1976.

F. W. Bernstein lived and worked in Berlin-Steglitz. He and his wife Sabine had two children. He died on 20 December 2018, aged 80.

Work 
His works are held by the German National Library, including:
 
 
 
 
 
 
 
 
 
 
 
 
 
 
 
 
 
 
 
 
 
 
 
 
 
 
 
 
 
 
 
 
 Frische Gedichte. Verlag Antje Kunstmann, München 2017, .

Exhibitions
 2011 F. W. Bernstein: Den Rest können Sie sich denken! Mathematikum
 2013 F. W. Bernstein zum 75. Geburtstag. Wilhelm Busch – Deutsches Museum für Karikatur & Zeichenkunst
 2013 F. W. Bernstein – Zeichenzausels Werkschau. Museum für Komische Kunst, Frankfurt am Main

Awards 
Bernstein received several awards, including:
 2003: 
 2003: 
 2008: Kassel Literary Prize for grotesque humour
 2008: Wilhelm Busch Prize
 2011: 
 2018: Ludwig Emil Grimm-Preis for caricature

Notes

References

External links 

 
 
 Der Göttinger Elch
 Nachruf auf den Karikaturisten F.W. Bernstein Ein fast schon kriminell bescheidener Mann  rbb24.de 21 December 2018

1938 births
2018 deaths
People from Göppingen
People from the Free People's State of Württemberg
German poets
Writers from Baden-Württemberg
German cartoonists
German-language poets
German caricaturists
Academic staff of the Berlin University of the Arts